Darja Kapš (born November 26, 1981) is a Slovene chess player with the title of Woman Grandmaster.

Kapš played for the Slovenian Olympic team in 35th Chess Olympiad, 36th Chess Olympiad and 39th Chess Olympiad. She won the Woman  Slovenian Chess Championship in 2001 and 2004.

References

External links
 
 
 Personal home page

1981 births
Chess woman grandmasters
Living people
Slovenian female chess players
Sportspeople from Novo Mesto